Mellis is a surname. Notable people with the surname include:

Jacob Mellis (born 1991), English footballer
John Mellis, English author
Louis Mellis, Scottish actor and screenwriter
Margaret Mellis (1914–2009), Scottish artist